{{DISPLAYTITLE:C20H25NO}}
The molecular formula C20H25NO may refer to:

 Difemetorex, or diphemethoxidine
 Diphepanol
 Glemanserin
 Methoxphenidine
 Normethadone
 Pridinol
 Talopram

Molecular formulas